was a village located in Yamamoto District, Akita Prefecture, Japan.

As of 2003, the village had an estimated population of 4,687 and a density of 38.55 persons per km². The total area was 121.57 km².

On March 27, 2006, the Minehama, along with the town of Hachimori (also from Yamamoto District), was merged to create the town of Happō.

External links
Minehama official website in Japanese

Dissolved municipalities of Akita Prefecture
Happō, Akita